The  is a small car manufactured by the Japanese automaker Toyota from 1961 until 1978. Conceived as a family car to fulfill the requirements of the Japanese Government's "national car concept", it was the smallest Toyota car during that period and was superseded in that role by the Toyota Starlet, which itself started out as a version of the Publica. It was available as a 2-door vehicle only, but in a selection of body styles, ranging from the base sedan through a station wagon, convertible, coupé and even a coupe utility (pickup), which outlived the other models by a decade, and spawned other models, such as the Toyota Sports 800 and the Toyota MiniAce.

Development

MITI "national car" concept 
The origins of the Publica can be traced to the "national car" concept of the powerful Japanese Ministry of International Trade and Industry (MITI), which was announced in 1955.

From concept to reality 
Although Eiji Toyoda was initially keen to take advantage of the, at that time innovative, FF concept (front-mounted engine with front-wheel drive), it proved technically too complicated for Toyota engineers to be able to complete within the allotted time, so the decision was made to switch to more conventional FR layout. The Publica was inspired by the successful Citroën 2CV which also used a 2-cylinder, air-cooled, horizontally opposed engine, with front-wheel drive. In spite of the fact that the government sources announced that significant tax breaks would be made for cars with engine displacements of less than 500 cc, Toyota decided that such a small engine would provide insufficient power on the highways, and increased the planned displacement to 700 cc. The resulting engine was an air-cooled 697 cc ohv 2-cylinder boxer which produced , and was known internally as the Toyota U engine. The tax incentives did not materialize; the displacement did qualify in the lowest annual road tax bracket, thus helping sales. In 1966 Toyota began to acquire kei car manufacturer Daihatsu.

The new car was given a two-door sedan body, which was intended to accommodate four people and a significant amount of luggage in the trunk, thus fulfilling the projected expectations of the customers. The car had a double wishbone suspension in the front and semi-elliptical leaf springs in the rear.

The name "Publica" was chosen with reference to the English phrase "public car", referring to the car's intended attainability and popularity. Due to lack of distinction between the "l" and "r" consonants in Japanese the name can be sometimes misinterpreted as paprika. The name is transliterated as "パブリカ" in Katakana, literally paburika.

P10 series 

The new car was given the internal designation of "UP10" and the market name of "Publica" and was sold through a new dealer network, separate from the previous "Toyota" and "Toyopet" dealerships, called Toyota Publica Store (later renamed as Toyota Corolla Store). Initially, the car was very basic, lacking even such basic options like a radio or even a heater. This limited its appeal to the consumers, which were perceiving the automobile as an aspirational good and expected it to exude a much more luxurious impression.

The now defunct Central Motors produced the Publica convertible from October 1963.

Further development of the UP10 series 
In 1962, a two-door "light van" version was added, essentially a station wagon but classified as a commercial vehicle in Japan. A derivative model, Toyota Sports 800 (marketed initially as "Publica Sport") debuted at the 1962 Tokyo Motor Show. In 1963 Toyota added a new Deluxe trim level, denoted internally as "type UP10D", which featured such "luxuries" as reclining seats, Combustion heater or radio, as well as some chrome decors (the previous base model was now called Standard). With the appearance of the Deluxe, demand finally picked up, and when the convertible model was added the same year, sales of the Publica finally reached the target level of 3000–4000 monthly.

In November 1964, it was introduced in Canada as one of the first two Toyota models available in the country, the other being the S40 Crown.

P20 Series 

In 1966, Toyota launched the revised Publica range, designated UP20. The engine displacement was increased from 697 cc to 790 cc, and claimed power output from 35 PS to 36 PS (the engine was now called 2U) while the convertible received the  twin carburetor engine from the Sports 800. The Publica dealerships were later renamed "Toyota Corolla Store" after the popularity of the Corolla won out over the Publica as an affordable, small car.

In 1966, Toyota also launched the Toyota MiniAce cab over van, based on the UB20 Publica. In March 1968 the production of the Publica Van version was moved to Hino Motors, after that company was taken over by Toyota. 1968 also saw the launch of Publica Super version, which came with the engine of the Sports 800. The P20 Publica was replaced by the all-new P30 series in April 1969.

The former Central Motors produced the Publica convertible until December 1968.

Sales of the P10 and P20 Publicas:

P30 Series

New model, new engine, new image 

In April 1969, a whole new generation of the Publica was launched. The car was effectively now a scaled down version of the Corolla, sitting on a shortened Corolla wheel-base. The Publica 800 has  and a top speed of only , while the 1100 SL could reach . The 800 and 1000 were available with Standard or Deluxe equipment, both in Sedan and Van bodystyles.

Originally a two-door sedan and a three-door wagon (called Van in Japan, as it was intended for commercial use) were available. The pickup version, added in October 1969, was now officially known as "pickup". The pickup was originally only available with the 1 liter engine, although the 1.2 was made available after the January 1972 facelift. The situation in the Japanese market changed, as demand developed rapidly, partially fuelled by the post-WWII baby boomers coming of age and gaining their driver's licenses. Having the Corolla firmly established as the family car offering, Toyota did not market the Publica as the "popular car" anymore, but rather as an entry-level vehicle for first-time young buyers.

Many of the commercial iterations of the Publica were built by Hino Motors at their Hamura plant, beginning in 1970. Daihatsu also built Publicas, starting in September 1969. In 1969, the Publica dealerships were renamed "Toyota Corolla" dealerships.

Publica SL and Daihatsu Consorte 

The most powerful version was the Publica SL, which featured the  1.1 L K-B twin carburetor engine also offered in the Corolla SL. In September, after only half a year, this engine was replaced by the 1.2 L 3K-B unit in both the Corolla and Publica SL's. At the same time, the Toyoglide automatic transmission became available in 1 litre Publicas. As Toyota had just started its relationship with Daihatsu, in 1969 the latter launched the Daihatsu Consorte, which was essentially a mildly restyled P30 Publica. It was, however, powered initially by Daihatsu's own 1.0-litre "FE" engine, which had already seen service in the previous Daihatsu model, the Compagno.

Facelifts and Starlet 
October 1970 saw minor changes to the range, including a new instrument panel, and a new High Deluxe version featuring the single-carburetor version of the 1.2 L engine and front disc brakes. A more substantial facelift took place in January 1972, when the KP30 Publica was given new front and rear fascias and a new "semi-fastback" style. The U-engine model was dropped at this time, as the boxer unit could not clear emission standards anymore. 1973 saw the introduction of the Toyota Publica Starlet (designation KP40), a coupé version of the facelifted Publica. In June 1976 a five-speed transmission became available in the P50, the first Publica to be thus equipped. The facelifted sedan continued in production until February 1978, when it was replaced by the KP60, marketed as the Toyota Starlet. The Van (sometimes referred to as a Utility Wagon by Toyota) was built until June 1979, while the Publica pickup was not withdrawn until August 1988. Later pickups were fitted with the desmogged 1,166 cc 3K-HJ (from November 1975) and then the 1,290 cc 4K-J engines (from June 1979), although export versions retained the 1-litre 2K engine. The pickup also received a five-speed gearbox from August 1985.

Models
UP30: 790 cc (2U-C/2U-B) sedan
KP30: 993 cc (2K) sedan
KP30-S: 1,077 cc (K-B) sedan, 1969.04-1969.09
KP31: 1,166 cc (3K/3K-B) sedan
UP36V: 790 cc (2U-C) van
KP36/V: 993 cc (2K) pickup/van
KP37/V: 1,166 cc (3K, 3K-H) pickup/van
KP38: 1,166 cc (3K-HJ) pickup, emissions controls for commercial vehicle
KP39: 1,290 cc (4K-J) pickup
KP50: 1,166 cc (3K-U) sedan, emissions controlled engine (1976.01-1978.01)

Toyota 1000 
The P30 Publica with the 993 cc 2K engine was known as the Toyota 1000 in most markets outside Japan. With a DIN rating, the engine had  in export trim. The Toyota 1000 continued to be the only offering smaller than the Corolla in most export markets even after the Publica replacement (the P40 Toyota Starlet) was introduced for Japan in 1973.  Branded as the Toyota 1000, the car was launched on the West German market, at the time Europe's largest national auto-market, in the fourth quarter of 1974. It had an unusually lavish list of included features that included radial tyres, front headrests, tinted windows, a heated rear window and even a radio. In some European markets such as Switzerland and the Netherlands, it was marketed with the additional name "Copain". In Belgium it was sold as the "Toyota Osaka" for a while. The pickup version was sold in Finland as the Toyota Timangi.

The Toyota 1000 sedans and wagons were replaced by the P60 Starlet in 1978 but the Toyota 1000 pick-up continued to be sold next to the Starlet sedans and wagons. The Toyota 1000 range included a two-door sedan, a three-door wagon, and a two-door coupe utility (pickup). In South Africa, the Toyota 1000 range also included a pick-up with the 1,166 cc 3K engine.

References

External links 
Toyota Publica（1st generation）Gazoo.com (Japanese)
Toyota Publica（2nd generation）Gazoo.com (Japanese)

Publica
1960s cars
1970s cars
MITI projects
Subcompact cars
Rear-wheel-drive vehicles
Cars introduced in 1961
Cars powered by boxer engines
Cars powered by 2-cylinder engines